Juan Ignacio Antonio (born 5 January 1988) is an Argentine former professional football who played as a forward.

External links
 Argentine Primera statistics
 Player profile on the River Plate website

1988 births
Living people
People from Trelew
Argentine footballers
Argentine expatriate footballers
Association football forwards
Club Atlético River Plate footballers
Brescia Calcio players
Ascoli Calcio 1898 F.C. players
U.C. Sampdoria players
S.S.D. Varese Calcio players
Parma Calcio 1913 players
FeralpiSalò players
Serie A players
Serie B players
Serie C players
Expatriate footballers in Italy